Óscar Molina Casillas (born January 2, 1990) is a former American amateur and professional boxer who qualified for the 2012 Summer Olympics, representing Mexico. His twin brother, Javier, competed for the USA at the 2008 Summer Olympics.

Career

He participated at the 2008 Youth World Amateur Boxing Championships in Guadalajara, Mexico where he obtained the gold medal. At the 2010 Central American and Caribbean Games he won the silver medal losing the final to local Christian Peguero. Later he achieved the silver medal at the 2011 Pan American Games held in Mexico when he lost to Cuban Carlos Banteux.

In May 2012, he qualified for the London 2012 Summer Olympics after winning the silver medal at the Rio Pre-Olympic tournament where he lost to local Myke Carvalho. In London, he lost in the first round to Custio Clayton of Canada.

Professional career

Molina turned professional in January 2013, winning a unanimous decision over Hector Mendoza. He amassed a record of 13-2-1, but has not fought since 2017, suffering two consecutive defeats to Jarrett Hurd and Levan Ghvamichava.

References

1990 births
Living people
American male boxers
American boxers of Mexican descent
Bantamweight boxers
Welterweight boxers
Olympic boxers of Mexico
Boxers at the 2012 Summer Olympics
Pan American Games silver medalists for Mexico
Pan American Games medalists in boxing
Boxers at the 2011 Pan American Games
People from Commerce, California
Boxers from California
Central American and Caribbean Games silver medalists for Mexico
Competitors at the 2010 Central American and Caribbean Games
Central American and Caribbean Games medalists in boxing
Medalists at the 2011 Pan American Games